William Ewart Adshead (10 April 1901 – 26 January 1951) was an English cricketer who played 12 first-class matches for Worcestershire in the 1920s. He was later known as William Ewart Barnie-Adshead.

Adshead made his first-class debut for Worcestershire against Sussex at Worcester in August 1922, scoring 4 and 17. He did not play again until 1924, and in that and the following season appeared a total of 10 times, holding 13 catches. He scored his only half-century when he made 51 against Warwickshire at Edgbaston in May 1925; this was the only match in which he acted as wicket-keeper. He did not play at all in 1926 or 1927, but returned for one final game against Nottinghamshire in 1928, scoring 1 and 0 and taking one catch.

Adshead was born in Tividale, Dudley; he died at the age of 49 in Edgbaston, Birmingham.

His brother, Frank, played twice for Worcestershire in 1927.

References

External links
 

1901 births
1951 deaths
English cricketers
Worcestershire cricketers